The International Working-Class Movement is a projected seven-volume history of the communist movement, edited by Moscow's Institute of the International Working Class Movement. Its first volume was chaired by Boris Ponomarev.

References

Bibliography 

 
 
 
 
 

1976 non-fiction books
Russian-language books